Parliamentary elections are scheduled to be held in Slovakia on 30 September 2023 to elect members of the National Council.  

The 2020 Slovak parliamentary election resulted in a coalition government led by the Ordinary People and Independent Personalities movement. On 15 December 2022 the Slovak government lost a no-confidence vote, and a snap election in 2023 was demanded by the President of Slovakia, Zuzana Čaputová, and the opposition. The last snap election in Slovakia was in 2012.

Composition of the National Council
At the first parliamentary session on 20 March 2020, 6 parliamentary groups were established: OĽaNO, Smer, We Are Family, ĽSNS, SaS and For the People.

Opinion polls

Notes

References

Slovakia
Parliamentary
Parliamentary elections in Slovakia